was a  after Daiji and before Chōshō. This period spanned the years from 1131 through 1132.

Change of Era 
 January 31, 1131 : The new era name was created to mark an event or series of events.  The previous era ended and the new one commenced in Daiji 6, on the 29th day of the 1st month of 1131.

Events of the Tenshō Era
 1131 (Tenshō 1, 12th month): The udaijin Fujiwara Yetada was elevated to sadaijin; and the naidaijin Arihito filled that vacancy by becoming udaijin.  The dainagon Fujiwara no Munetada was made nadaijin.

Notes

References

 Brown, Delmer and Ichiro Ishida, eds. (1979). [ Jien, c. 1220], Gukanshō; "The Future and the Past: a translation and study of the 'Gukanshō,' an interpretive history of Japan written in 1219" translated from the Japanese and edited by Delmer M. Brown & Ichirō Ishida. Berkeley: University of California Press.  
 Titsingh, Isaac, ed. (1834). [Siyun-sai Rin-siyo/Hayashi Gahō, 1652], Nipon o daï itsi ran; ou,  Annales des empereurs du Japon.  Paris: Oriental Translation Fund of Great Britain and Ireland.
 Varley, H. Paul, ed. (1980). [ Kitabatake Chikafusa, 1359], Jinnō Shōtōki ("A Chronicle of Gods and Sovereigns: Jinnō Shōtōki of Kitabatake Chikafusa" translated by H. Paul Varley). New York: Columbia University Press.

External links
 National Diet Library, "The Japanese Calendar" -- historical overview plus illustrative images from library's collection

Japanese eras